Master of the World, published in 1904, is one of the last novels by French pioneer science fiction writer, Jules Verne. At the time Verne wrote the novel, his health was failing. Master of the World is a "black novel," filled with foreboding and fear of the rise of tyrants such as the novel's villain, Robur, and totalitarianism.

Plot outline 
Set in the summer of 1903, a series of unexplained events occur across the Eastern United States, caused by objects moving with such great speed that they are nearly invisible. The first-person narrator,  John Strock, 'Head inspector in the federal police department' in Washington, DC, travels to the Blue Ridge Mountains of North Carolina to investigate. He discovers that all the phenomena are being caused by Robur, a brilliant inventor. (He was previously featured as a character in Verne's Robur the Conqueror.)

Robur has perfected a new machine, which he has dubbed the Terror. It is a ten-meter long vehicle, capable of operating as a speedboat, submarine, automobile, or aircraft. It can travel at the (then) unheard of speed of 150 miles per hour on land and at more than 200 mph when flying.

Strock tries to capture the Terror but instead is captured himself. Robur drives the strange craft to elude his pursuers, heading to the Caribbean and into a thunderstorm. The Terror is struck by lightning, breaks apart, and falls into the ocean. Strock is rescued from the vehicle's wreckage, but Robur's body is never found. The reader is left to decide whether or not he has died.

Literary significance and criticism 
Master of the World contains a number of scientific ideas, current to Verne's time, which are now widely known to be errors. For example, traveling at high speed does not reduce a vehicle's weight.

Allusions/references 
The novel's events take place in the summer of 1903, as characters refer to events of the 1902 Mount Pelée eruption on Martinique. Verne took a few liberties with American geography in the novel. It is set in Morganton, North Carolina and refers to a mountain known as the Great Eyrie. The name suggests Mount Airy, located elsewhere in North Carolina; its description as flat-topped is similar to the mountain nearby known as Table Rock. Another portion of the novel is described as taking place at a large deep natural lake in Kansas, but there is no such lake.

Reception

Adaptations 
 The film Master of the World (1961) starred Vincent Price and Charles Bronson. The scriptwriter Richard Matheson combined elements of this book and its predecessor in the screenplay, as well as adding others of his own. 
 A half-hour TV cartoon special by the same name was produced in the late 1970s.
Robur is featured as a character in Kim Newman's alternate history novel, The Bloody Red Baron (1995), serving as the chief airship engineer of the Central Powers. The chapter featuring him and his airship is entitled "Master of the World."
The Terror appears in the game Pirates of the Mysterious Islands.
Robur and his first mate Tom Turner are featured as central characters in T.E. MacArthur's steampunk novels, The Volcano Lady: Volume One and Volume Two.  The "Terror" is suggested as part of the tie-in with Verne's original novels Robur the Conqueror and Master of the World.

See also 
 1904 in science fiction

External links 

 
  Maître du Monde, audio version 

Novels by Jules Verne
1904 French novels
1904 science fiction novels
French science fiction novels
Novels set in the 1900s
Novels set in North Carolina
Fiction set in 1903
Aviation novels
Sequel novels
French novels adapted into films